Georges Turcot (September 13, 1851 – March 15, 1908) was a Canadian politician.

Born in Ste-Marie de Beauce, Canada East, the son of Augustin Turcot, and Margaret Tardif, he was educated at the College of Ste. Marie. A merchant, he was elected to the House of Commons of Canada for the riding of Mégantic in the 1887 federal election. A Liberal, he was defeated in the 1891 election and was re-elected in the 1896 election and 1900 election. He was also secretary-treasurer of the municipality, a member of the Municipal Council and mayor for three years, and was warden of the county.

References
 

1851 births
1908 deaths
Liberal Party of Canada MPs
Members of the House of Commons of Canada from Quebec